The following is a list of episodes for the animated television series: W.I.T.C.H. Most of these episodes are based on the first two arcs of the W.I.T.C.H. comic books, The Twelve Portals and Nerissa's Revenge.

Series overview

Episodes

Season 1 (2004–05)
This season is loosely based on The Twelve Portals saga.
Unlike the other four Guardians of the Veil, Will does not begin developing her very own elemental abilities until after the lowering of the Veil in season 2.

Season 2 (2006)
This season is loosely based on the Nerissa's Revenge saga.
Episodes are titled by letters of the alphabet.
This season is titled Dimension W.I.T.C.H. in French.
Will finally develops her own elemental power of quintessence, in addition to being Keeper of the mystical Heart of Kandrakar.

Notes

References

External links
 

Episodes
Lists of Disney television series episodes
Lists of French animated television series episodes
Lists of American children's animated television series episodes